Comedy Company Classics is the second and final studio album by Australian comedy television series The Comedy Company. The album was released in November 1989 and peaked at number 98 on The Australian ARIA Charts.

At the ARIA Music Awards of 1990 the album was nominated for ARIA Award for Best Comedy Release.

Track listing

Charts

Release history

References

1989 albums
1980s comedy albums
The Comedy Company albums